Governor Wolcott may refer to:

Oliver Wolcott, 19th Governor of Connecticut
Oliver Wolcott Jr., 24th Governor of Connecticut
Roger Wolcott (Massachusetts politician), 39th Governor of Massachusetts